Neeli Bendapudi is an American academic administrator who is the 19th president of the Pennsylvania State University. From 2018 until 2021, she served as the 18th president of the University of Louisville. In December 2021, the Pennsylvania State University announced that it had named Bendapudi as its next president, to succeed Eric J. Barron upon his retirement. She assumed office in May 2022 and is the first woman and the first non-white person to serve as Penn State's president.

Early life and education
Bendapudi was born in India and attended Andhra University, where she earned her undergraduate and master's degrees. She moved to the United States to attend graduate school at the University of Kansas, where she earned her Ph.D. in marketing.

Career
Bendapudi held teaching posts at both Ohio State University and Texas A&M University before returning to the University of Kansas to serve as the dean of the University of Kansas School of Business. From July 1, 2016, until her election as president at Louisville, she served as provost and executive vice chancellor of the University of Kansas. Following her tenure at the University of Kansas, her successor cut 150 faculty and staff positions in the midst of budget strains.

Bendapudi was named president of the University of Louisville on April 3, 2018, and her first day was May 15, 2018. She replaced James R. Ramsey, who resigned after a scandal that implicated him. Bendapudi is the first non-white president of the University of Louisville and indicated an intention to develop a culture of openness.  Bendapudi resigned as president of the University of Louisville on December 13, 2021, following her selection as the 19th president of the Pennsylvania State University.

On July 13, 2018, Bendapudi, in response to Papa John's Pizza founder John Schnatter's use of a racial slur, announced that Schnatter's name would be struck from U of L's football stadium's name.

References

External links
Penn State biography

Living people
Presidents of the University of Louisville
Andhra University alumni
University of Kansas alumni
People from Visakhapatnam
People from Louisville, Kentucky
Presidents of Pennsylvania State University
1962 births
Indian American